The 2013 season was Bunyodkors 7th season in the Uzbek League in Uzbekistan. Bunyodkor completed first treble in the season. They completed a Domestic double winning both the League and Cup. Also Bunyodkor youth team won 2013 Uzbek Youth League. Bunyodkor also competed in the AFC Champions League, reaching the Round of 16 stage before being knocked out by Buriram United of Thailand.

Club

Current technical staff

Squad

Transfers

Winter 2012-13

In:

 

Out:

Players on Trial
The following players have been on trial during training camps in January–February, 2013

 ( Obolon Kyiv)
 ( FC Akzhayik)
 ( FK Budućnost Podgorica)

Summer 2013

In:

Out:

Friendly matches

Pre-season

Mid-season

Competitions
Bunyodkor was present in all major competitions: Uzbek League, the AFC Champions League and the Uzbek Cup.

Uzbek League

Results summary

Results by round

Results

League table

Uzbek Cup

AFC Champions League

Group stage

Knockout stage

Squad statistics

Appearances and goals

|-
|colspan="14"|Players who left Bunyodkor during the season:

|}

Goal scorers

Disciplinary record

References

Sport in Tashkent
FC Bunyodkor seasons
Uzbekistani football clubs 2013 season